Jives may refer to:
Jive, of one of the villains in the 1992 American novel The Thief of Always by Clive Barker
Jives, the English name of the character Maggi Mjói from the Icelandic educational musical children's television program LazyTown